Jefferson Jair Bernárdez Bennett (born 27 March 1987) is a Honduran football forward who currently plays for Parrillas One.

Club career
Nicknamed La Foca, Bernárdez's professional debut was on 11 February 2007, in a match against Broncos UNAH, where he scored the only goal via a perfect header. He was in the starting lineup since the match was at the same time as the UNCAF Nations Cup in El Salvador.

In January 2010 he made his debut for Real Estelí in the Nicaraguan League against Diriangén.

In September 2010 he moved to Guatemala to play for second division Nueva Concepción and in July 2011 he moved up to the top division to join Petapa after scoring 16 goals for Nueva Concepción.

International career
He made his debut for the national side on 22 May 2008 in a friendly against Belize. He was part of the Honduras national U-23 football team that played at the 2008 Summer Olympics.

Personal life
Jefferson Bernárdez is the cousin of Victor Bernardez and Oscar Bernardez. In July 2009, his father died in a fire.

References

1987 births
Living people
People from La Ceiba
Association football forwards
Honduran footballers
Honduras international footballers
Footballers at the 2008 Summer Olympics
Olympic footballers of Honduras
F.C. Motagua players
Hispano players
Real Estelí F.C. players
Antigua GFC players
Parrillas One players
Liga Nacional de Fútbol Profesional de Honduras players
Honduran expatriate footballers
Expatriate footballers in Nicaragua
Expatriate footballers in Guatemala
Honduran expatriate sportspeople in Nicaragua
Honduran expatriate sportspeople in Guatemala
Deportivo Petapa players